Savignies is a commune in the Oise department in northern France.

Notable people
Philippe Adrien (1939-), stage director

See also
 Communes of the Oise department

References

External links

 Savignies The website of the village

Communes of Oise